Black Mambas FC is a Zimbabwean football club based in Harare, Zimbabwe. It is based at Riga, Latvija and its major sponsors are the Swedbank and LIDO.

The team colours are black and gold at home and gold and black away.

There is also

Current squad 

	

	

		

Nat=Zimbabwe|name=Didymus Chakabva pos=}}GK}}
{{Fs player|no=_

Staff
Chairman
 Mekia Tanyanyiwa
"Secretary" Anthony Mangezi
"Vice Secretary" Andrew Phiri
"Treasurer" Maaserwe

Head Coach
 John Ncube

Assistant Coach
 Martin Bonongwe

Goalkeeper's Coach
 Winston Chihore

Team Manager
 Teddy Zhou

Technical Advisor
  Madinda Ndlovu

References

External links 
 Black Mambas news page on FootballZone (archived).

Football clubs in Zimbabwe
Association football clubs established in 1926
1926 establishments in Southern Rhodesia